Haydon Meadow known locally as Clifford Meadow is a 6.39 hectare biological Site of Special Scientific Interest in Wiltshire, notified in 1999.

The site lies within the Parish of Haydon Wick and is home to Anacamptis morio a rare protected species of Orchid family Orchidaceae. This flower was adopted as the logo for the nearby Priory Vale housing development.

Sources

 Natural England citation sheet for the site (accessed 1 April 2022)

References

External links
 Natural England website (SSSI information)

Sites of Special Scientific Interest in Wiltshire
Sites of Special Scientific Interest notified in 1999
Meadows in Wiltshire